Doing It In Lagos: Boogie, Pop & Disco in 1980s Lagos is a compilation album released in 2016 by Soundway Records. It collects Nigerian pop and club culture tracks released in the late 1970s through the 1980s. Though afrobeat, led by artists like Fela Kuti, dominated Nigerian music during the 1970s, Doing It In Lagos chronicles Nigerian music's move away from the afrocentric style of afrobeat and toward more American forms of pop music in the 1980s. Many of the tracks are rare and, prior to this album's release, were sold for high prices in online auctions.

Track listing

References 

2016 compilation albums
Music in Lagos